Jonna Albers  (born February 28, 1994) is an American ice hockey player, currently playing in the Premier Hockey Federation (PHF) with the Minnesota Whitecaps, who she won an Isobel Cup with in 2019. Prior to that, she captained the New Hampshire Wildcats women's ice hockey team, twice earning a Hockey East All-Star Honorable Mention.

Career 
As a youth player, Albers was a finalist for the Minnesota Ms. Hockey award in 2012, and set the Elk River High School scoring records in points and assists.

From 2012 to 2017, she attended the University of New Hampshire, scoring 106 points in 122 NCAA games.

She originally planned on retiring from hockey after her college ice hockey career, until the expansion to Minnesota was announced by the National Women's Hockey League (NWHL; renamed PHF in 2021).

After the 2018–19 season, she was named NWHL Newcomer of the Year, and was named to both the 2019 and 2020 NWHL All-Star teams, playing as one of the top scorers for the Whitecaps. In 2019, the Whitecaps won the Isobel Cup, and made it to the finals in 2020, before the COVID-19 pandemic indefinitely postponed the game.

Personal life 
Outside of hockey, Albers works as an engineer.

Career statistics

External links

References 

1994 births
Living people
American women's ice hockey forwards
Isobel Cup champions
Minnesota Whitecaps players
New Hampshire Wildcats women's ice hockey players
People from Elk River, Minnesota
Premier Hockey Federation players
21st-century American women